James Fairlie may refer to:
 James Fairlie (minister), Scottish minister of the Church of Scotland
 James Ogilvie Fairlie, Scottish amateur golfer and landowner
 Jamie Fairlie, Scottish footballer
 Jim Fairlie (MSP), member of the Scottish Parliament

See also
Jim Fairlie (disambiguation)